Edward Thomas John (14 March 1857 – 16 February 1931), known as E.T. John, was a radical Welsh Liberal Party politician who later joined the Labour Party.

Background
He was born in Pontypridd on 14 March 1857, the son of John John and Margaret Morgan. He married in 1881, Margaret Rees of Caerwiga Pendoylan, Glamorgan. They had three sons and two daughters.

Career
He was a Welsh Nationalist and Pacifist. He served as Liberal Member of Parliament for East Denbighshire from 1910–18. His Welsh Nationalism dominated his early profile in parliament and he wrote a number of publications; Wales, its notable Sons and Daughters; St. David's Day Addresses Delivered Before the Cleveland and Durham Welsh National Society, 1905–1910 [1911], Home Rule for Wales; Addresses to "young Wales" [1912], Cymru a'r Gymraeg. [1916] and Wales, its Politics and Economics. He made contributions to Welsh Monthlies and Quarterlies; y Beirniad, y Genedl, Wales, The Welsh Outlook, etc.
In 1914 his pacifism took centre stage as he opposed Britain's entry into World War One. Along with a number of other pacifist Liberal and Labour MPs he joined the pressure group the Union of Democratic Control in 1914. His East Denbighshire seat disappeared for the 1918 General Election being merged into a new Denbighshire seat. He decided to contest the new seat but under new party colours. He had joined the Labour Party and had their endorsement but did not receive endorsement from the Coalition Government and was defeated by a Liberal who did; 

He again stood as a Labour candidate for parliament at the 1922 General Election but this time in Brecon and Radnorshire;

He did not contest the General Election of 1923 when Jenkins was returned unopposed, but he contested the 1924 General Election and finished third;

He did not stand for parliament again.
He was President of the National Union of Welsh Societies, 1916–26, President of the Celtic Congress, 1918–27 and President of the Peace Society, 1924–27. He was a member of the Honourable Society of Cymrodorion, the Cambrian Archæological Society, the Historical Society of West Wales and the Anglesey Antiquarian Society. He served as a Justice of the Peace for the Borough of Middlesbrough.

Sources
Who Was Who
British parliamentary election results 1885–1918, Craig, F. W. S.

References

External links
 
Who Was Who; http://www.ukwhoswho.com

1857 births
1931 deaths
Liberal Party (UK) MPs for Welsh constituencies
UK MPs 1910–1918
Labour Party (UK) parliamentary candidates